Newfoundland is an unincorporated community located within both West Milford Township in Passaic County and  Jefferson Township in Morris County, in New Jersey, United States. It is located along Route 23 and is the mailing address of Green Pond, a private lake in Rockaway Township.

Newfoundland was a popular resort destination at the turn of the 20th century. Several resort hotels including Brown's Hotel and Idylease Inn relied on the railroad to bring guests for the resort season. The New Jersey Midland Railway developed the Newfoundland station in 1872. New York, Susquehanna and Western Railway provided passenger service until the 20th century and still travels through the area carrying freight. The 2003 independent film The Station Agent was set and filmed largely in Newfoundland, with the train station featured in the film.

Newfoundland is also the home of a nationwide food waste program called AmpleHarvest.org.   AmpleHarvest.org was launched in 2009 to end hunger and food waste by helping millions of gardeners nationwide donate excess food to thousands of local food pantries.  The program came out of a local program that started donating food from its community garden to food pantries in Newfoundland and other nearby areas.

References

External links

 The West Milford Messenger (local newspaper)
 Newfoundland Station web site
 Idylease Website

Jefferson Township, New Jersey
West Milford, New Jersey
Unincorporated communities in Morris County, New Jersey
Unincorporated communities in Passaic County, New Jersey
Unincorporated communities in New Jersey